The New York Liberties were one of six teams in the Major League Volleyball franchise.  The league began in 1987 and ended short of completing a full season in 1989.  Players consisted of former collegiate All Americans and Olympians.

The team played at Hofstra University and the Westchester County Center.

Results
The Liberties placed 3rd in 1987 and 4th in 1988.

Coaching
The Liberties were led by legend and Hall of Fame player/coach Mary Jo Peppler who was the setter in 1987 and for most of 1988 except in a few matches in which former Olympian and later beach player/partner Karolyn Kirby filled in.

Former players
Players for this team were: Jo Ellen Vrazel (RS)(88-89); April Chappel (OH) (1987); Sandy Aughinbaugh (OH) (87-88); Karolyn Kirby (OH) (replaced Chappel in 1987-88); Wendy Stevenson S/Def. Specialist)(87-88); Laura Smith (MB); Ellen Crandal Orner (MB)(1988); Ellen Bugalski (MB)(1987); Nina Mathies (1988); Lira Vance (1988);

About former players

Ellen Crandal Orner, a native of Pennsylvania, attended Penn State and has an ice cream flavor after her called the "Crandal Crunch."  Orner was traded to the NY Liberties in 1988 from the Dallas Belles (that franchise ended in 1987).  Ellen started MLV with the Chicago Breeze in 1987.
Laura Smith's father died during her second year with the team and dedicated one of her matches in his memory.  Smith was also known for her competitive and feisty spirit was a great asset to the Liberty block.
April Chapple was a powerful OH for NY but left the team prematurely in 1987 due to a torn cartilage in her knee.  At the time of her departure she was ranked third for kills in the league.  She was replaced by Carolyn Kirby.
Sandy Auginbaugh started season two while attending law school and missed some practice with the team. Auginbaugh was Major League Volleyball's best server in 1987, a designation that had she won it in 1988 would have netted her $5,000.00 extra as the league began with pay incentives for performance.

References

External links
1988 New York times article about the Liberties

Volleyball clubs in the United States
Volleyball competitions in the United States
Volleyball in New York (state)